Edwin Austin Forbes (1839 – March 6, 1895) was an American landscape painter and etcher who first gained fame during the American Civil War for his detailed and dramatic sketches of military subjects, including battlefield combat scenes.

Biography
Forbes was born in New York, studied under Arthur Fitzwilliam Tait, and began as an animal and landscape painter. During the Civil War, he was special artist for Frank Leslie's Magazine. Many of the spirited etchings he drew during the conflict were later presented by General Sherman to the government.  They are now preserved in the War Office at Washington because of their historic value.

After the war, Forbes painted landscape and cattle scenes, among which are "Orange County Pasture" (1879) and "Evening—Sheep Pasture" (1881).  In 1877 he was made an honorary member of the London Etching Club.

He died in 1895 in Brooklyn and is interred in Green-Wood Cemetery.

References

External links

Life Studies of the Great Army, a digital collection of The University of Alabama Libraries Division of Special Collections
Green-Wood Cemetery Burial Search

19th-century American painters
American male painters
American printmakers
People of New York (state) in the American Civil War
American etchers
American war artists
Burials at Green-Wood Cemetery
1839 births
1895 deaths
Painters from New York City
19th-century war artists
19th-century American male artists